is a Japanese manga artist. She writes primarily for Shogakukan in the shōjo manga magazine Betsucomi. She is best known as the author of Backstage Prince and Black Bird. In 2009, Black Bird received the 54th Shogakukan Manga Award for shōjo manga. Both Backstage Prince and Black Bird are licensed in English in North America by Viz Media.

Selected works 
  (2001–2002)—2 volumes
 Rakuen (2004)
 Backstage Prince (2004–2005)
  (2006)—1 volume
  (2006–2014)
  (2015–present)—11 volumes, on-going
 Baby, Star
 Bitter – Nakechau Koi Monogatari
 Eikoku Kizoku Goyoutashi
 Yasashii Te
 Yurusarete Inai Watachitachi
 Gokko
 Sono Hakui wo Nuide
 Last Notes

References

External links 
 
 Official website 

Women manga artists
Manga artists from Tokyo
Living people
People from Tokyo
Japanese female comics artists
Female comics writers
Japanese women writers
Year of birth missing (living people)